The following is a list of nicknames of CONMEBOL national association football teams.

Nicknames 

 Nicknames in italics are commonly used in English.

See also 

 List of national association football teams by nickname

References 

Nickname CONMEBOL
National CONMEBOL
Lists of nicknames